Dan Taras (born 13 April 1994) is a Moldovan footballer who plays as a midfielder.

Career
Born in Sărata-Galbenă, he has played club football for Rapid Ghidighici, Petrocub Hîncești, Sfântul Gheorghe and Ripensia Timișoara.

He made his international debut for Moldova in 2018.

References

1994 births
Living people
Moldovan footballers
Moldova international footballers
Association football midfielders
Moldovan Super Liga players
FC Rapid Ghidighici players
CS Petrocub Hîncești players
FC Sfîntul Gheorghe players
Liga II players
FC Ripensia Timișoara players
Moldovan expatriate footballers
Expatriate footballers in Romania
Moldovan expatriates in Romania